Ron Sobieszczyk (September 21, 1934 – October 23, 2009) was an American professional basketball player.

Also known as Ron Sobie, Sobieszczyk played for coach Ray Meyer at DePaul University from 1953 to 1956. He scored 1,222 points in his college career and participated with the College All-Stars team that toured with the Harlem Globetrotters. After college, he played four seasons in the NBA with the New York Knicks and Minneapolis Lakers, scoring 1,691 points before suffering a knee injury. He then served brief stints with the Washington Generals exhibition team and the Chicago Majors of the ABL.

Sobieszczyk later owned Sobie's Bar and Grill in Cicero, Illinois.

Sobieszczyk died on October 23, 2009 of a degenerative brain disease.

References

External links

1934 births
2009 deaths
American men's basketball players
American people of Polish descent
Basketball players from Chicago
Basketball players from Wisconsin
Chicago Majors players
Deaths from neurodegenerative disease
DePaul Blue Demons men's basketball players
Fort Wayne Pistons draft picks
Minneapolis Lakers players
Neurological disease deaths in Illinois
New York Knicks players
People from Racine County, Wisconsin
Point guards
Shooting guards
Washington Generals players